Ozyory, also spelled Ozery, is the name of several inhabited localities in Russia.

Ozyory, Moscow Oblast, a town in Moscow Oblast, administratively incorporated as a town under oblast jurisdiction
Ozery, Tver Oblast, a village in Zharkovsky District of Tver Oblast

See also
Aziory, Populated places in Belarus, whose Russian-language name is Ozyory